Andy Lapthorne and David Wagner defeated Sam Schröder and Niels Vink in the final, 2–6, 6–4, [10–7] to win the quad doubles wheelchair tennis title at the 2022 Australian Open.

Dylan Alcott and Heath Davidson were the four-time defending champions, but were defeated by Schröder and Vink in the semifinals.

Seeds

Draw

Bracket

References

External links
 Drawsheet on ausopen.com

Wheelchair Quad Doubles
2022 Quad Doubles